Bakheet, also transliterated Bakhet or Bakhit, and sometimes even Bekheet or Bekhit, and also sometimes preceded by Al- or El-, is an Arabic surname.

Notable people with this surname include:
 Abdullah Bin Bakheet, Saudi journalist and novelist
 Amina Bakhit, Sudanese middle-distance runner
 Marouf al-Bakhit, Jordanian politician 
 Mohammed Abduh Bakhet, Qatari long-distance runner
 Mohammad Al-Bakhit, Jordanian Taekwondo practitioner
 Omer Mohamed Bakhit, Sudanese footballer
 Rawya Bekhit, Emirati volleyball player
 Saad Bakheet Mubarak, Emirati footballer
 Salem Nasser Bakheet, Bahraini athlete
 Suleiman Bakhit, Jordanian entrepreneur
 Waleed Al-Bekheet, Kuwaiti hammer thrower
 Yaseen Al-Bakhit, Jordanian footballer 
 Zuhair Bakheet, Emirati footballer